Following is the list of 19 prisoner-of-war camps set up in Allied-occupied Germany at the end of World War II to hold the Nazi German prisoners of war captured across Northwestern Europe by the Allies of World War II. Officially named Prisoner of War Temporary Enclosures (PWTE), they held between one and two million Nazi German military personnel from April until September 1945. 

Prisoners held in the Allied camps were designated Disarmed Enemy Forces, not the Prisoners of War. This specific designation was introduced in March 1943 by SHAEF commander in chief Dwight D. Eisenhower in order to conform with the logistics of the Geneva Convention.

Camps of the U.S. Army 
The Rheinwiesenlager camps are listed from north to south. Most of them were located near villages on the western side of the river Rhine.

References

 
Germany
POW
Prisoner of war camps